Kilmore is a village, civil parish and townland of  in County Down, Northern Ireland, about  from Crossgar. It is situated in the historic baronies of Castlereagh Upper and Kinelarty.

History
Kilmore derives its name from the Irish word 'an Chill Mhór', meaning "the big church", as it is most famous for the historic 18th century Anglican church the building for which is now located in the Ulster Folk and Transport Museum. Eighty years after the church was built in 1790, a new church was built  nearby in 1870 to heal rifts within the church concerning the nature of Anglo-Catholic worship in the decades prior. It remains the place of worship for the same Church of Ireland congregation Church Parish of Kilmore to this day.

Sport
Kilmore has a Football Club called Kilmore Rec FC, which plays at Robert Adams Park, Crossgar.

Civil parish of Kilmore
The civil parish contains the villages of Crossgar and Kilmore.

Townlands
The civil parish contains the following townlands:

Ballydyan
Barnamaghery
Broaghclogh (also known as Murvaclogher)
Cahard
Carnacally
Clontaghnaglar
Creevyargon
Creevycarnonan
Crossgar
Drumaghlis
Drumgiven
Drumnaconagher
Kilmore
Lisnamore
Lissara
Listooder
Magheralone
Murvaclogher (also known as Broaghclogh)
Rademon
Raleagh
Rossconor
Teconnaught
Tullynacree

References

Villages in County Down
Townlands of County Down